Enteromius rubrostigma is a species of ray-finned fish in the genus Enteromius which is found in coastal rivers in Gabon, Cameroon, Republic of the Congo and Democratic Republic of the Congo.

Footnotes 

 

Enteromius
Taxa named by Max Poll
Taxa named by Jacques G. Lambert 
Fish described in 1964